ScotFestBC: The British Columbia Highland Games  is the second oldest continually running Highland Games in British Columbia, Canada. The games are run by the ScotFestBC Organizing Committee as a program of the United Scottish Cultural Society of Vancouver. The 2022 Games will be held at Town Centre Park on June 17 & 18, 2022 in Coquitlam.

The British Columbia Highland Games is a traditional Scottish highland games, with competitive athletics, music and dancing.  The Games include Scottish heavy events (caber tossing), pipe bands and solo piping competitions, Highland Dancing, whisky school, cultural workshops, Scottish Clan displays, Scottish country dancing, Celtic artisans, kids activities, live Celtic entertainment, beer service and massed pipe bands at end of day.

Traditional events include:
 Solo Piping
 Solo Drumming
 Pipe Bands
 Performance Pipe Bands
 Highland Dancing
 Whisky tasting
Educational workshops
Friday night events
 Children's activities
 Celtic Yoga
 Heavy Events, which include:
Stone put
Weight throw
Scottish hammer throw
Weight over the bar
Sheaf toss
Caber toss
Farmers walk
 Piobaireachd competition
 Beer service
 Food & merchandise vendors
 Main stage entertainers/performers

References

External links
 Official Site

Sport in Coquitlam
Culture of Coquitlam
Highland games
Multi-sport events in Canada
Sports festivals in Canada
Folk festivals in Canada